Surachai Danwattananusorn (born 24 December 1942, disappeared 10 December 2018) is a Thai political activist and former political prisoner. He was the last communist to be pardoned in Thailand, and after his release he entered mainstream politics, becoming a committee member of the Thai Rak Thai Party and founding the Red Siam political movement. Surachai is known for his anti-monarchist views, which have resulted in a past arrest under Thailand's lèse majesté laws.

Surachai has been in exile in neighbouring Laos since the Thai military coup of 2014. He disappeared after the murder of two other anti-monarchist activists in December 2018.

Political career 

Surachai became well known after the Thammasat University massacre, as he was a prominent member of the Communist Party of Thailand. He was sentenced to death for murder and his participation in a train robbery but received a royal pardon in 1988.

After his release, Surachai entered mainstream politics, first as a member of the New Aspiration Party under the leadership of Chavalit Yongchaiyudh, and later as a Thai Rak Thai Party candidate for the House of Representatives. He also ran for the senate seat of Nakhon Si Thammarat, but was never elected to any office.

In 2006, Surachai participated in protests to oust the Council for National Security junta. Afterwards, he established the Red Siam political movement with Jakrapob Penkair.

On 6 August 2007, while on stage at a United Front for Democracy Against Dictatorship rally, Surachai allegedly insulted then-Prime Minister Chuan Leekpai. He was found guilty by a criminal court and was fined 50,000 baht, but the fine was later reduced by half after Surachai confessed to the crime.

Surachai was arrested again on 22 February 2011, this time according to the arrest warrant of the Criminal Court 27/2554, for committing lèse majesté at a speech near Sanam Luang. On 28 February 2012, The Criminal Court sentenced him to 7 years and 6 months in prison. However, Surachai received a royal pardon on 3 October 2013.

Personal life 
Surachai Danwattananusorn was born Surachai Saedan on 24 December 1942 in Thaphaya Tumbol, Pak Phanang District, Nakhon Si Thammarat Province. He was the son of Yokyuan and Somchao Saedan. Surachai graduated with a Bachelor of Arts in political science from Sukhothai Thammathirat Open University. He has married three times, and has three sons and a daughter.

Disappearance 
Surachai disappeared from Vientiane, Laos, in December 2018. His spouse last heard from him on 10 December. Thai Prime Minister Gen. Prayut Chan-ocha visited Vientiane on December 13. Two of his aides, Chatchan "Phoo Chana" Boonphawal and Kraidet "Kasalong" Luelert, also in exile in Vientiane, were last seen in Laos on 11 December before they too disappeared.

On 26 and 27 December 2018, the bodies of the two aides were discovered floating in the Mekong River near Nakhon Phanom. Reports of a third body being found have been denied by Thai authorities.  Surachai remains missing.

Some in the Thai media see the forced disappearances and murders as a warning to anti-monarchists.

Human Rights Watch has documented the disappearance of two other Thai activists in Laos, one in 2016 and another in 2017. The number of "disappeared" Thai activists exiled in Laos may be as high as five since 2015.

See also
List of people who disappeared

References 

1942 births
2010s missing person cases
Living people
Missing people
Surachai Danwattananusorn
Enforced disappearances
Surachai Danwattananusorn
Surachai Danwattananusorn
Political prisoners
Surachai Danwattananusorn
Surachai Danwattananusorn
Surachai Danwattananusorn
Surachai Danwattananusorn
Surachai Danwattananusorn
Surachai Danwattananusorn
Surachai Danwattananusorn